The Theodosius Cistern is one of many ancient cisterns of Constantinople that lie beneath the city of Istanbul, Turkey. The modern entrance is in Piyer Loti Caddesi, Fatih.

History

It was built by Roman Emperor Theodosius II between 428 and 443 to store water supplied by the Valens Aqueduct.  The Aqueduct of Valens was redistributed by Theodosius from its original supply to the Nymphaeum, the Baths of Zeuxippus and the Great Palace of Constantinople.  This redistribution led to the construction of the Theodosius Cistern.  

Like the Basilica Cistern and the Binbirdirek Cistern, it is once again open to the public, having been under restoration for eight years as of April 2018.

See also

List of Roman cisterns

References

Further reading
 

Installing a Cistern that is Easy in Modern Time Retrieved August 29, 2022.

Roman cisterns
443 establishments
Cisterns in Istanbul
5th-century introductions
Buildings and structures completed in the 5th century
Byzantine secular architecture
5th-century establishments in the Byzantine Empire